The 2003 Virginia Tech Hokies football team represented the Virginia Tech in the 2003 NCAA Division I-A football season. The team's head coach was Frank Beamer. They played their home games at Lane Stadium in Blacksburg, Virginia and participated as members of the Big East Conference.

Schedule

Rankings

References

Virginia Tech
Virginia Tech Hokies football seasons
Virginia Tech Hokies football